Polyptychia is a genus of moths of the family Notodontidae first described by Cajetan and Rudolf Felder in 1874. It consists of the following species:
Polyptychia fasciculosa C. Felder & R. Felder, 1874
Polyptychia hermieri J. S. Miller, 2009

Notodontidae of South America